Interleukin-1 beta (IL-1β) also known as leukocytic pyrogen, leukocytic endogenous mediator, mononuclear cell factor, lymphocyte activating factor and other names, is a cytokine protein that in humans is encoded by the IL1B gene. There are two genes for interleukin-1 (IL-1): IL-1 alpha and IL-1 beta (this gene). IL-1β precursor is cleaved by cytosolic caspase 1 (interleukin 1 beta convertase) to form mature IL-1β.

Function 
The fever-producing property of human leukocytic pyrogen (interleukin 1) was purified by Dinarello in 1977 with a specific activity of 10–20 nanograms/kg.  In 1979, Dinarello reported that purified human leukocytic pyrogen was the same molecule that was described by Igal Gery in 1972. He named it lymphocyte-activating factor (LAF) because it was a lymphocyte mitogen. It was not until 1984 that interleukin 1 was discovered to consist of two distinct proteins, now called interleukin-1 alpha and interleukin-1 beta.

IL-1β is a member of the interleukin 1 family of cytokines. This cytokine is produced by activated macrophages as a proprotein, which is proteolytically processed to its active form by caspase 1 (CASP1/ICE). This cytokine is an important mediator of the inflammatory response, and is involved in a variety of cellular activities, including cell proliferation, differentiation, and apoptosis. The induction of cyclooxygenase-2 (PTGS2/COX2) by this cytokine in the central nervous system (CNS) is found to contribute to inflammatory pain hypersensitivity. This gene and eight other interleukin 1 family genes form a cytokine gene cluster on chromosome 2.

IL-1β, in combination with IL-23, induced expression of IL-17, IL-21 and IL-22 by γδT cells. This induction of expression is in the absence of additional signals. That suggests IL-1β is involved in modulation of autoimmune inflammation 

Different inflammasome complex — cytosolic molecular complex — have been described. Inflammasomes recognize danger signals and activate proinflammatory process and production of IL-1β and IL-18. NLRP3 (contains three domain:  pyrin domain, a nucleotide-binding domain and a leucine-rich-repeat) type of inflammasome is activated by various stimuli and there are documented several diseases connected to NLRP3 activation like type 2 diabetes mellitus , Alzheimer's disease, obesity and atherosclerosis.

Properties 

The molecular weight of the proteolytically processed IL-1β is 17.5 kDa.
IL-1β has the following amino acid sequence:
 APVRSLNCTL RDSQQKSLVM SGPYELKALH LQGQDMEQQV VFSMSFVQGE ESNDKIPVAL GLKEKNLYLS CVLKDDKPTL QLESVDPKNY PKKKMEKRFV FNKIEINNKL EFESAQFPNW YISTSQAENM PVFLGGTKGG QDITDFTMQF VSS
The physiological activity determined from the dose dependent proliferation of murine D10S cells is 2.5 x 108 to 7.1 x 108 units/mg.

Clinical significance 

Increased production of IL-1β causes a number of different autoinflammatory syndromes, most notably the monogenic conditions referred to as Cryopyrin-Associated Periodic Syndromes (CAPS), due to mutations in the inflammasome receptor NLRP3 which triggers processing of IL-1B.

Intestinal dysbiosis has been observed to induce osteomyelitis through a IL-1β dependent manner.

The presence of IL-1β has been also found in patients with multiple sclerosis (a chronic autoimmune disease of the central nervous system). However, it is not known exactly which cells produce IL-1β. Treatment of multiple sclerosis with glatiramer acetate or natalizumab has also been shown to reduce the presence of IL-1β or its receptor.

Role of inflammasome and IL-1β in carcinogenesis 
Several types of inflammasomes are suggested to play role in tumorgenesis due to their immunomodulatory properties, modulation of gut microbiota, differentiation and apoptosis. Over-expression of IL-1β caused by inflammasome may result in carcinogenesis. Some data suggest that NLRP3 inflammasome polymorphisms is connected to malignancies such as colon cancer and melanoma. It was reported that IL-1β secretion was elevated in the lung adenocarcinoma cell line A549. It has also been shown in another study that IL-1β, together with IL-8, plays an important role in chemoresistance of malignant pleural mesothelioma by inducing expression of transmembrane transporters.  Another study showed that inhibition of inflammasome and IL-1β expression decreased development of cancer cells in melanoma.

Retinal degeneration 
It has been shown that IL-1 family plays important role in inflammation in many degenerative diseases, such as age-related macular degeneration, diabetic retinopathy and retinitis pigmentosa. Significantly increased protein level of IL-1β has been found in the vitreous of diabetic retinopathy patient. The role of IL-1β has been investigated for potential therapeutic target for treatment of diabetic retinopathy. However, systemic using of canakinumab did not have an significant effect. The role of IL-1β in age-related macular degeneration has not been proven in patient, but in many animal models and in vitro studies it has been demonstrated the role of IL-1β in retinal pigmented epithelial cells and photoreceptor cells damage. NLRP3 inflammasome activate caspase-1 which catalyze cleavage of inactive cytosolic precursor pro-IL-1β to its mature form IL-1β. Retinal pigmented epithelial cells forms blood retinal barrier in human retina which is important for retinal metabolic activity, integrity and inhibition of immune cells infiltration. It has been shown that human retinal pigmented epithelial cells can secrete IL-1 β in exposure to oxidative stress. The inflammatory reaction leads to damage of retinal cells and infiltration of cells of the immune system. The inflammatory process including NLRP3 upregulation is one of the causes of age-related macular degeneration and other retinal diseases that lead to vision loss.

Therapies targeting interleukin 1 beta
Anakinra is a recombinant and slightly modified version of the human interleukin 1 receptor antagonist protein.  Anakinra blocks the biologic activity of IL-1 alpha and beta by competitively inhibiting IL-1 binding to the interleukin type 1 receptor (IL-1RI), which is expressed in a wide variety of tissues and organs. Anakinra is marketed as Kineret and is approved in the US for treatment of RA, NOMID, DIRA.

Canakinumab is a human monoclonal antibody targeted at IL-1B, and approved in many countries for treatment of cryopyrin-associated periodic syndromes.

Rilonacept is an IL-1 trap developed by Regeneron targeting IL-1B, and approved in the US as Arcalyst.

Orthographic note
Because many authors of scientific manuscripts make the minor error of using a homoglyph, sharp s (ß), instead of beta (β), mentions of "IL-1ß" [sic] often become "IL-1ss" [sic] upon automated transcoding (because ß transcodes to ss). This is why so many mentions of the latter appear in web search results.

References

Further reading

External links 
 

Interleukins